Life and Nothing More is a 2017 Spanish drama film directed by Antonio Méndez Esparza. It was screened in the Contemporary World Cinema section at the 2017 Toronto International Film Festival. It was produced by Aquí y Allí Films (Pedro Hernández Santos) with support from ICAA, TVE and Movistar+. Distributed by Wanda Vision, it was theatrically released in Spain on 1 December 2017.

See also 
 List of Spanish films of 2017

References

External links
 

2017 films
2017 drama films
Spanish drama films
Aquí y Allí Films films
2010s English-language films
2010s Spanish films
John Cassavetes Award winners